This is a week-by-week listing of the NCAA Division I teams ranked in the 2015 Top 25 coaches poll of the National Soccer Coaches Association of America (NSCAA),  the most widely recognized national collegiate soccer ranking system in the U.S. Several weeks prior to the season and each week during the playing season, the 206 Division I teams are voted on by a panel of 24 coaches from the division during a weekly conference call, with the rankings then announced early on Tuesday afternoon (Eastern Time). The poll has no bearing on the selections for the 2015 NCAA Division I Men's Soccer Championship, and the coaches association states: "The NSCAA College Rankings are an indicator of week-to-week status of qualified programs and in no way should be used as a guide or indicator of eligibility for championship selection."

rv = Receiving votes in the poll.

See also 
 2015 NCAA Division I men's soccer season
 College soccer

References

NCAA
College soccer rankings in the United States
United Soccer Coaches